Andre Previn Rison (born March 18, 1967) is a former American football wide receiver who played professionally for the National Football League (NFL)'s Indianapolis Colts, Atlanta Falcons, Cleveland Browns, Jacksonville Jaguars, Green Bay Packers, Kansas City Chiefs, Oakland Raiders, and the Canadian Football League (CFL)'s Toronto Argonauts. Rison was selected to the Pro Bowl five times, from 1990 to 1993 and once again in 1997.

Rison won a Super Bowl championship with the Packers in 1997 over the New England Patriots, scoring the first points of the game on a 54-yard touchdown catch from quarterback Brett Favre.  He also won a Grey Cup championship with the Toronto Argonauts in 2004. He is one of the few players to win professional football championships in both the United States and Canada. He was released by the Argonauts during the 2005 CFL season. He holds an NFL record for scoring a touchdown with 7 teams.

He was a star player at Flint Northwestern High School and in college at Michigan State University. As a senior at Michigan State, Rison had 30 receptions for 709 yards and 5 touchdowns; he was a prominent contributor to the 1987 Michigan State squad that won the Rose Bowl on January 1, 1988.

During the early portion of his career, he received the nickname "Bad Moon" Rison, a reference to the Creedence Clearwater Revival song Bad Moon Rising. Michael Adler is credited with giving the nickname to Chris Berman. When he played for the Chiefs, he had the nickname "Spiderman".

Professional career

Indianapolis Colts
The Indianapolis Colts selected Rison in the first round (22nd overall) of the 1989 NFL Draft. In his rookie season, he caught 52 passes for 820 yards with four touchdown receptions.

Atlanta Falcons
On April 20, 1990, the Indianapolis Colts traded Rison, Chris Hinton, a fifth round pick in the 1990 NFL Draft, and their first round pick on the 1991 NFL Draft to the Atlanta Falcons for their first overall pick and their fourth round pick in the 1990 NFL Draft. The Indianapolis Colts used the trade to move up to select Jeff George first overall in the 1990 NFL Draft. His next season marked the first of five very productive campaigns with the Falcons. During these years, Rison finished near the top of most receiving categories, and led all NFL players with 15 receiving touchdowns in 1993. Andre Rison was only the 5th Receiver in NFL history to score 60 touchdowns in his first six seasons. Rison led the NFL in most receptions in his first four and first five seasons. Rison was second in the NFL for most receptions in six seasons. During his final season in Atlanta, on June 9, 1994, his girlfriend at the time Lisa Left Eye Lopes from TLC burned Rison's house down.

Cleveland Browns
After the 1994 season, Rison signed a lucrative free agent contract with Cleveland, where he was expected to become the featured receiving threat for the Browns, who had made the playoffs the year before.  Rison, who had been named to the Pro Bowl in four of his previous six seasons, had career lows in receptions (47), yards (701), touchdowns (3), receptions per game (2.9), and yards per game (43.8). Rison also developed a feud with the Cleveland fans, who were angered over the announcement that the team would be relocating to Baltimore. After a home loss to the Packers, Rison, who had been booed by the fans throughout the game, lashed out, stating, "We didn't make the fucking move. So, for all the booers, fuck you too. I'll be glad when we get to Baltimore, if that's the case. We don't have any home-field advantage. I've never been booed at home. Baltimore's our home. Baltimore, here we come." Rison, however, did not make the move with the team to Baltimore as he joined the Jacksonville Jaguars in the offseason.

Later career
In 1996, Rison spent the first ten games with the Jacksonville Jaguars, catching 34 passes for 458 yards and two touchdowns. Rison had a miscommunication with quarterback Mark Brunell in week 12 that resulted in an interception in a 28-3 loss to the Pittsburgh Steelers. This mistake caused tempers to flare between the two, and Rison was subsequently released. 

The Green Bay Packers claimed Rison off of waivers on November 20, 1996. He played in five of the remaining games, catching 13 passes for 135 yards and one touchdown. In three playoff games, culminating in a Super Bowl appearance, he caught seven passes for 143 yards and two touchdowns.

He signed with the Chiefs prior to the 1997 season. For the second time in his career (1993 being the only other time), Rison started in all 16 games of the season. He caught 72 passes for 1,092 yards and seven touchdowns as the Chiefs went on to become the #1 seed that year. In the Divisional round playoff game, Rison caught eight passes for 110 yards, but the Chiefs lost 14–10 to division rival and eventual Super Bowl champion Denver Broncos. The following year, he caught 40 passes in 14 total games for 542 yards and five touchdowns. For 1999, he played 15 games and regressed further, catching 21 passes for 218 yards with no touchdowns.

With the Oakland Raiders in 2000, he played in all 16 games without starting, catching 41 passes for 606 yards and six touchdowns. The Raiders made a run in the playoffs, and Rison made small contribution, catching three combined passes for 44 yards.

Rison finished his NFL career with 743 receptions for 10,205 yards and 84 touchdowns, along with eight kickoff returns for 150 yards and nine carries for 23 yards.

Toronto Argonauts
He signed with the Toronto Argonauts of the Canadian Football League in August 2004, who went on to win the 92nd Grey Cup championship that year. He was released by the team in August 2005.

Nicknames
Rison is also remembered for his life off the football field, which garnered him the nickname "Bad Moon" Rison from ESPN sportscaster Chris Berman, alluding to the song "Bad Moon Rising" by Creedence Clearwater Revival.

During his three-season stint with Kansas City, Rison was nicknamed Spider-Man and would often fake shooting a web, like Spider-Man after scoring a touchdown. Rison gave himself the nickname in part because he viewed Spider-Man as a positive character and wanted to be thought of as less of a headache and problem. His "Spider-Man" nickname has been named one of the best nicknames in sports history by Bleacher Report.

Life after football

Coaching
In the 2006–2008 high school football seasons, Rison was assistant coach at Beecher High School in Flint, Michigan. The head coach was Courtney Hawkins, Rison's former teammate at Michigan State.

In March 2010, Rison was named the new head coach for Flint Northwestern High School's football team.

For the opening week of the 2010 and 2011 high school football seasons, Rison and Flint Northwestern faced off against Courtney Hawkins and Flint Beecher. Not only did these games showcase two former NFL players coaching at their alma maters, but the schools are so close geographically that it made for an intriguing and intense rivalry. The crowds came in large numbers for both games, which forced each game to Flint's 11,000 seat Atwood Stadium, instead of Flint Beecher's Russ Reynolds Field or Flint Northwestern's Guy V. Houston Stadium. Beecher won the 2010 opener, 28–18, spoiling Rison's head coaching debut. The 2011 opener was a thriller, with Northwestern holding on for a 46-44 double overtime victory. In two years at Flint Northwestern, Rison's coaching the team showed noticeable improvement in his second season, nearly doubling their offensive output, and losing four of their games by a combined total of only nine points. In May 2012, Rison announced that he was leaving Flint Northwestern in order to complete his degree at Michigan State and join the football team as an assistant coach.

Andre Rison coached in 2014 for Skyline High School in Ann Arbor, Michigan, as the offensive coordinator, where he recorded an 0–9 record. He also coached his son Hunter Rison, who committed to Michigan State on April 1, 2016.

Other interests
Rison also trains wide receivers at the Andre Rison Football Academy, and he coached in the 2008 Hawaii All-Star Classic.  Rison appeared on an episode of the MTV reality show Made. He worked to help a student become a high school varsity quarterback.
Rison was a featured Pro on the second season of the reality show Pros vs. Joes on Spike TV, and also appeared in an episode of TNA Impact (now called Impact Wrestling). He was at the center of the hexagonal ring, and then Abyss came out and Black Hole slammed Rison.

Rison appears prominently in the 2012 ESPN 30-30 documentary Broke about former professional athletes who squander their wealth.  The film, directed and written by Billy Corben of Rakontur, was featured at the 2012 Tribeca Film Festival as part of its TFF/ESPN Sports Festival, and is included in the second season (styled as "Volume II")  of ESPN's 30 for 30 documentary series.

On May 30, 2017, Rison was one of eight new inductees announced for the Michigan Sports Hall of Fame in Detroit. The induction ceremony took place on September 15, 2017.

Personal life

Rison dated Lisa Lopes of TLC on and off from 1993 to 2001. Their relationship was rocky, marked with domestic violence allegations. During one altercation in 1994, Lopes lit his shoes on fire in the bathtub, burning his house down; she was charged with first-degree arson.

Andre's son, Hunter Rison, played as a true freshman wide receiver for Michigan State University in 2017, before transferring to Kansas State University in 2018. While at Kansas State, he was charged with battery of a young woman in June 2019. Shortly thereafter, he pledged to attend Fullerton College in 2020. After waiting out part of the COVID-19 pandemic in Arizona with his mother Racquel Banks, Hunter enrolled and played at Grand Valley State University in 2021.

References

External links
 
 
 
 
 
 
 

1967 births
Living people
Basketball players from Atlanta
Players of American football from Atlanta
Players of Canadian football from Atlanta
Sportspeople from Flint, Michigan
Basketball players from Flint, Michigan
African-American basketball players
American men's basketball players
Michigan State Spartans men's basketball players
Players of American football from Flint, Michigan
African-American players of American football
American football wide receivers
Michigan State Spartans football players
Indianapolis Colts players
Atlanta Falcons players
Cleveland Browns players
Jacksonville Jaguars players
Green Bay Packers players
Kansas City Chiefs players
Oakland Raiders players
National Conference Pro Bowl players
American Conference Pro Bowl players
African-American players of Canadian football
Canadian football wide receivers
Toronto Argonauts players
21st-century African-American people
20th-century African-American sportspeople
10,000 receiving yards club